What Demons Do to Saints is the debut album of metalcore band Beneath the Sky. It was released on January 23, 2007.

Track list
"Goodfellas"  – 3:56
"For Each Remembered Name"  – 4:18
"A Grave Mistake"  – 3:41
"Last Call"  – 2:15
"7861"  – 4:51
"How the Times Have Changed"  – 4:36
"Our Last Road"  – 3:25
"The Reason"  – 3:51
"Being in a Coma Is Hell Carried On"  – 5:13
"Falling in Love with Cold Hands"  – 4:56
"The Glamour of Corruption"  – 4:52

Personnel
Beneath the Sky
 Joey Nelson – lead vocals
 Jeff Nelson – guitar
 Chris Profitt – guitar
 Nick Scarberry – bass, clean vocals
 Brandon Sowder – drums
 Matt Jones – keytar

Album Notes
"7861", "Our Last Road", and "Being in a Coma Is Hell Carried On" are slower-paced renditions of the tracks that appeared on More Than You Can Handle....
"Falling in Love with Cold Hands" was rewritten, and shortened compared to the old demo version recorded in 2005.
"How the Times Have Changed" is sometimes erroneously referred to as "No Such Thing as Control".
A music video was shot for "7861".

References

External links
Official Myspace Profile
Official Victory Records Page

2007 debut albums
Beneath the Sky albums
Victory Records albums
Albums produced by Jason Suecof